This is a list of cancellations and terminations made by NASA.

Program terminations
U.S. participation in ExoMars - 2012
Mars Scout Program - 2010
Constellation program - 2010
New Millennium Program - 2009
Project Prometheus - 2005

Additional examples
NASA X-38 (Crew Return Vehicle)- 2002
Lockheed Martin X-33 - 2001
HL-20 Personnel Launch System - 1993

Terminations (post-launch)
MESSENGER - 2015
LADEE - 2014
Deep Impact - 2013
RXTE -  2012
GRAIL - (2012)
Stardust - 2011
WMAP - 2010
Spirit - 2010
TRACE - 2010
FAST - 2009
Ulysses - 2009
Phoenix - 2008
MGO - 2006

Mission cancellations (developmental)
Gravity and Extreme Magnetism - 2012
International X-ray Observatory - 2011
Terrestrial Planet Finder - 2011
Laser Interferometer Space Antenna - 2011
Space Interferometry Mission - 2010
Mars Telecommunications Orbiter - 2009
Jupiter Icy Moons Orbiter - 2005
Europa Orbiter - 2002
Deep Space 3 (a.k.a. Starlight)
Deep Space 4 (a.k.a. Champollion)
Voyager program (Mars) - 1971

References

See also
List of NASA missions
List of extraterrestrial memorials

NASA lists
NASA